Deh Parah-ye Kesht Varzeh-ye Jafarqoli (also Romanized as Deh Parah-ye Kesht Varzeh-ye Ja‘farqolī; also known as Deh Parah) is a village in Zaz-e Sharqi Rural District, Zaz va Mahru District, Aligudarz County, Lorestan Province, Iran. At the 2006 census, its population was 33, in 7 families.

References 

Towns and villages in Aligudarz County